The 2018 Montana Supreme Court Clerk election was held on November 6, 2018 to elect the Clerk of the Montana Supreme Court. The election was part of the 2018 Montana elections.

Incumbent Democratic Clerk Ed Smith opted not to run for re-election. Republican Bowen Greenwood and Democrat Rex Renk won their respective primaries uncontested.

Democratic primary

Candidates

Declared
Rex Renk, deputy clerk of the Montana Supreme Court

Declined
Ed Smith, incumbent

Results

Republican primary

Candidates

Declared
Bowen Greenwood, communications director for the Montana Public Service Commission

Results

General election

Campaign
The campaign for the office was relatively low-profile compared to those for United States Senate and United States House of Representatives. Democratic nominee Rex Renk ran on his experience as deputy clerk, and argued that the office should be non-partisan, as the role is non-political. Republican nominee Bowen Greenwood agreed that the office's work is non-partisan but said that Montanans may want to elect someone who shares their values in non-partisan offices as well. Libertarian nominee Roger Roots said that he would work to "maximize the right of the individual" if elected.

Renk's campaign mascot was a Tyrannosaurus rex.

Endorsements

Results

References

Clerk of the Montana Supreme Court elections
2018 Montana elections